The Anina-Doman oil field is a shale oil field located in Anina, Caraș-Severin County. It was discovered in 1790 but remained undeveloped.

References

Oil fields in Romania